Grace Elizabeth Berger (born June 3, 1999) is an American college basketball player for the Indiana Hoosiers of the Big Ten Conference.

High school career
Berger played basketball for Sacred Heart Academy in Louisville, Kentucky. In her junior season, she averaged 14.5 points, 8.6 rebounds and 3.5 assists per game, helping her team win the Seventh Region title and reach the state finals. As a senior, Berger earned Courier-Journal Athlete of the Year, Kentucky All-Star and Seventh Region Player of the Year honors after averaging 15.2 points, 8.3 rebounds and 3.1 assists and leading Sacred Heart back to the regional final. She was a three-time All-State selection in high school. Rated a five-star recruit by ESPN, Berger committed to play college basketball for Indiana over offers from Kentucky, Louisville and Michigan.

College career
As a freshman at Indiana, Berger averaged 5.5 points and 2.8 rebounds per game. In her sophomore season, she averaged 13.1 points, 5.2 rebounds and 3.5 assists per game, leading her team to a program-record 24 wins. She was a first-team All-Big Ten selection. On November 25, 2020, in her junior season debut, Berger recorded the first triple-double in program history, with 17 points, 10 rebounds and 10 assists in a 100–51 win against Eastern Kentucky. She led the NCAA Division I with three triple-doubles during the season. Berger averaged 15.4 points, 6.8 rebounds, 4.6 assists per game and was named first-team All-Big Ten. At the 2021 NCAA tournament, she led Indiana to its first-ever Elite Eight appearance. On February 12, 2022, Berger scored a career-high 29 points in a 76–58 win over Michigan State. As a senior, she averaged 16.2 points, 6.2 rebounds and 4.7 assists per game and was named first-team All-Big Ten for a third straight season. Berger opted to return for a fifth year of eligibility, granted due to the COVID-19 pandemic.

National team career
Berger represented the United States at the 2021 FIBA AmeriCup. She averaged 6.2 points, 3.6 rebounds and 2.2 assists per game, helping her team win the gold medal.

References

External links
Indiana Hoosiers bio
USA Basketball bio

Living people
American women's basketball players
Basketball players from Louisville, Kentucky
Point guards
Indiana Hoosiers women's basketball players
Sacred Heart Academy (Louisville) alumni
United States women's national basketball team players
1999 births